Greteli de Swardt (née Fincham; born 9 May 2001) is a South African actress, photographer, and artist. She is known for her roles in the kykNET series Alles Malan (2019–) and the Netflix series Blood & Water (2020–).

Early life
Fincham was born to parents Newton and Lisl. She has a sister. She attended Stellenbosch High School. She participated in school theatre productions and received a number of student and high school drama accolades.

Career
Fincham made her television debut as a young version of Tinarie van Wyk-Loots' character Annabel Loots in the 2019 Showmax series Dwaalster. That same year, she began starring as Elani Malan in the kykNET series Alles Malan. The following year, she began playing Reece van Rensburg in the Netflix English-language teen crime drama series Blood & Water. A supporting role in the first season, she was promoted to a more central role for Blood & Water'''s second season. She also played a young version of Cintaine Schutte's character Sophia in the kykNET comedy-drama Ekstra Medium.

She has upcoming roles in the films The Fix directed by Kelsey Egan and Moeksie & Patrysie''.

Personal life
In February 2022, she married videographer Juan de Swardt, having been engaged since November 2021. The couple are expecting their first child.

Filmography

References

External links
 
 Greteli Fincham at TVSA
 Greteli de Swardt at Artistes Personal Management

Living people
2001 births
21st-century South African actresses
South African television actresses
South African women photographers